F. Whitlock and Sons Ltd was a New Zealand-based company, well known for producing a popular range of Whitlock's pickles and sauces onwards from 1877.

Company history

The company was started by Frederick Whitlock (1833–1908) in Wanganui, New Zealand. Initially, manufacturing took place in the backyard of Frederick's residence before a purpose built factory was built in London Street, Wanganui in around 1902.

Products manufactured included Tomato Sauce, Worcestershire Sauce, Chutney, Chow Chow, Piccalilli, Vinegar, Cordials and Liqueur flavourings. In the early days, product was distributed by horse and cart locally and by ship to Nelson, Wellington, New Plymouth, Dunedin, Timaru, Christchurch, Greymouth and Auckland.

F. Whitlock & Sons Ltd was very much a family business, with four generations of Whitlocks joining and running the company before it was sold in 1985 to Australian company R M Gow Ltd. Thereafter, the company changed hands a couple more times before being purchased by another well known New Zealand food manufacturer, Cerebos Gregg Ltd. A short time later, the original plant and fittings were removed to Auckland and the Wanganui land and factory buildings were sold.

References

Honeyfield, A. (1997). The Whitlocks of Middlesex. Auckland: Evagean Publishing

Food manufacturers of New Zealand
Defunct food and drink companies of New Zealand
Companies disestablished in 1985
New Zealand brands
Condiment companies
Food and drink companies disestablished in 1985